William Alington, 1st Baron Alington of Killard (baptised 14 March 1610/1611 – buried 25 October 1648) was an Irish peer, the son of Sir Giles Alington. He was created 1st Baron Alington of Killard, on 28 July 1642.

Biography

He married Elizabeth Tollemache, daughter of Sir Lionel Tollemache, 2nd Baronet  and Elizabeth Stanhope, before 1 October 1631. They had at least 6 children:
Elizabeth Alington (1632-1691), who married firstly Charles Seymour, 2nd Baron Seymour of Trowbridge, and secondly Sir John Ernle, a Chancellor of the Exchequer; there were children from her first marriage
Giles Alington, 2nd Baron Alington of Killard (1640s-1660), who died before coming of age
William Alington, 3rd Baron Alington of Killard (bef. 1641–1685), who married, firstly, Lady Catherine Stanhope; secondly, Hon. Juliana Noel, by whom he had children; and thirdly, Lady Diana Russel, by whom he had children
Hildebrand Alington, 5th Baron Alington of Killard (1641–1722/23), who died unmarried
Catherine Alington, who married Sir John Jacob, 2nd Baronet, and had one child
Diana Alington, who died unmarried.

After his death, his widow, Lady Alington, remarried Sir William Compton, who died in 1663. She died in 1671.

References

Barons in the Peerage of Ireland
Peers of Ireland created by Charles I
1610 births
1611 births
1658 deaths